Kangni Alem (born 21 April 1966 in Lomé)  is a Togolese writer, translator and literary critic . He is also a  playwright and director, who in 1989 founded the Atelier Théâtre de Lomé ("Theatre Workshop of Lomé"). In 2003, he received the Great Literary Prize of Black Africa for his book, Cola Cola jazz.  Also of note is his short story collections such as La gazelle s'agenouille pour pleurer.

References

External links
Official site

Togolese writers
1966 births
Living people
People from Lomé
Togolese translators
20th-century Togolese writers
21st-century Togolese writers